A draped garment (draped dress) is a garment that is made of a single piece of cloth that is draped around the body; drapes are not cut away or stitched as in a tailored garment.  Drapes can be held to the body by means of knotting, pinning, fibulae, clasps, sashes, belts, tying drawstrings, or just plain friction and gravity alone. Many draped garments consist of only one single piece. 

An advanced form of the garment is the tailored dress, which is constructed from fabric that has been cut into pieces and stitched together to fit various parts of the body. In comparison to draped dresses, they are more fitted to the body.

History 
Draping is a most ancient and widespread form of clothing. Many visual arts of the Romans and Indian sculptures, terracottas, cave paintings, and wood carvings (also shown in picture gallery) representing men and women show the same, unstitched clothes with various wrapping and draping styles. 

Uttariya, and Antariya are few evident clothing items of draped garments from the Vedic period. Kasaya, another rectangular piece of the Buddhist robe, is a real example of the draped garment. Further evolved forms are Sari, and Odhni, etc.

The kāṣāya also called jiāshā (Chinese: 袈裟), Kasaya consists of three pieces i.e. the saṃghāti the most visible part of the buddhist attire. It was worn over the upper robe (uttarāsaṅga). Uttarāsaṅga is a robe covering the upper body that comes over the undergarment, or antarvāsa. The antarvāsa is the inner robe covering the lower body. The latter are covered with saṃghāti.

Examples 
More examples of draped clothing are:
 Uttariya an upper body garment.
 Adivasah is a loose-fitting outer garment, it is a type of over garment similar to a mantle or cloak
 Antariya a lower body garment.
Angvastra a kind of stole.
Various kind of headdresses for the protection and adornment of the head.
Stanapatta a chest band to cover the breasts.
 Sari is a draped garment of south Asia, typically wrapped around the waist, with one end draped over the shoulder, partly baring the midriff.
 traditional kilts and belted plaids
Peplos Long draped garment worn by women of Ancient Greece; often open on one side, with a deep fold at the top, and fastened on both shoulders.
Palla (garment) a long rectangular piece of cloth, folded in half lengthwise and used as a cloak by Roman women.
 chitons
loincloths
 togas a very long length of woolen fabric that Romans wrapped around themselves, draping it over the left shoulder and arm and leaving the right arm free.
 stolas long full robe with or without sleeves and drawn in with a belt; it was worn by Roman women, corresponding to the toga, that was worn by men. The stola was usually woollen.
sarongs or lungis
Sudanese thawb: Women's outer draped garment, a rectangular length of fabric, generally two meters wide and four to seven meters long.
 pareos
 longyis
 dhotis
 ponchos
 cloaks
 shawls
scarf
veshti a cloth wrap for the lower body in the Southern India.

Picture gallery

Present day use

Haute couture 
Wrapped and draped dresses continue to inspire many fashion designers. Madame Grès was a well-known French couturier known for her draping art. Her most notable work are so-called floor-length draped Grecian goddess gowns.

See also 
Drapery
Piece goods
Poshak
History of clothing
Clothing in ancient Rome
Modesty

References

External links 
 Institute of Draped Clothes

Clothing by material
Clothing
History of clothing
Textiles
Costume by period
Buddhist religious clothing